Almahdi Rural District is a rural district (dehestan) in Jowkar District, Malayer County, Hamadan Province, Iran. At the 2006 census, its population was 12,081, in 2,860 families. The rural district has 9 villages.

References 

Rural Districts of Hamadan Province
Malayer County